The 2018 WAC women's basketball tournament was a tournament held March 7–10, 2018, at the Orleans Arena in Paradise, Nevada.  Seattle the winner of the WAC Tournament earns an automatic trip to the 2018 NCAA tournament.

Seeds

Schedule

Bracket

See also
 2018 WAC men's basketball tournament

References

2017–18 Western Athletic Conference women's basketball season
WAC women's basketball tournament
WAC women's basketball tournament
Basketball competitions in the Las Vegas Valley
College basketball tournaments in Nevada
Women's sports in Nevada
College sports tournaments in Nevada